The Cordoba Near Eastern Research Unit (CNERU), is an interdepartmental and interdisciplinary unit of the Faculty of Humanities of the University of Córdoba (Spain), which offers undergraduate and graduate courses and seminars related to all areas of Near and Middle Eastern Studies and seeks to foster knowledge of Near and Middle Eastern societies from the ancient period to the modern times. Through its academic activities CNERU also seeks to promote dialogue and understanding on the complexities of the modern Middle East. CNERU assists with and enhances the dissemination of specialized knowledge of this field through publications and media diffusion in Spanish-speaking countries and abroad. CNERU was founded in 2012 within the Faculty of Humanities of Cordoba University.

Collaborating Institutions 
The Warburg Institute: University of London.
CEDRAC Université St. Joseph. Beirut.
Instituut voor Oosters Christendom. Radboud University Nijmegen.
Instituto De Filosofia. Universidade Do Porto.
Taylor-Schechler Genizha Research Unit. University of Cambridge.
Instituto de Lenguas y Culturas del Mediterráneo y Oriente Próximo. CSIC.
Institut del Pròxim Orient Antic.Universitat de Barcelona.

Publications 

Collectanea Christiana Orientalia. Volumes 1-11
Studia Semitica.
CNERU Books Series: Syro Arabica, Judaeo Islamica, Arabica Veritas, Semitica Antiqva and Abacvs.

References

External links 
 CNERU
 Universidad de Córdoba

Córdoba, Spain